The following table indicates the party of elected officials in the U.S. state of Kentucky:
Governor
Lieutenant Governor
Secretary of State
Attorney General
State Treasurer
Auditor of Public Accounts
Agriculture Commissioner

The table also indicates the historical party composition in the:
State Senate
State House of Representatives
State delegation to the United States Senate
State delegation to the United States House of Representatives

For years in which a presidential election was held, the table indicates which party's nominees received the state's electoral votes.

1792–1851

1852–present

See also
Law and government in Kentucky

References

Politics of Kentucky
Government of Kentucky
Kentucky